James A. Brittan was a Republican member of the Wisconsin State Assembly during the 1903 session. A native of Beloit, Wisconsin, he represented the 3rd District of Rock County, Wisconsin.

References

External links
The Political Graveyard

Politicians from Beloit, Wisconsin
Republican Party members of the Wisconsin State Assembly
Year of birth missing
Year of death missing